Razika was a Norwegian alternative indie pop band from Møhlenpris, Bergen with various indie rock, punk, ska and reggae influences. While their early work featured some tracks in English, they primarily composed songs in their native Norwegian. In 2010, they were signed to the Smalltown Supersound label and have released four albums: Program 91 (in 2011), På vei hjem (in 2013), Ut til de andre (in 2015) and Sånn Kjennes Verden Ut (in 2018). Exhibiting more of a synth pop style, their fourth studio represented a stylistic departure from their previous work. Razika split up in 2019 after the summer festival season.

Members
Razika is made up of:
Marie Amdam - lead singer, vocals, guitar, keyboards
Maria Råkil - el. guitar, vocals and lead guitar
Marie Moe - el. bass and vocals
Embla Karidotter - drums and vocals

Discography

Albums
2011: Program 91 (Smalltown Supersound)
2013: På vei hjem
2015: Ut til de andre
2018: Sånn Kjennes Verden Ut (Jansen Records)

Singles
2008: Love is All About the Timing
2011: Vondt i hjertet 
2014: Syndere i Sommersol 
2014: Faen Ta Deg
2015: Gi Meg, Gi Meg, Gi Meg
2016: Se deg ikke tilbake (Opplett)
 2018: En sjanse til (Jansen Records)
 2018: D Esje Meg (Jansen Records)
 2018: Flyplassen (Jansen Records)

EPs
2008: Love is All About the Timing

Other appearances 

2013: Ingen slipper unna politikken, (cover song released on the album "Real Ones & The Extended Family" by the band Real Ones)
2016: We are the world, on the Album Baertur by Baertur

References

All-female bands
Norwegian pop rock groups
Smalltown Supersound artists
Norwegian rock music groups